anna.aero (Airline Network News and Analysis) is a weekly e-journal and website devoted to airline and airport network planning, written by experienced airline and airport network planners, with experience ranging from easyJet, Go Fly and Birmingham Airport. Its work and research has been used in many airline and airport reports, and has been quoted in mainstream media as well as a financial report presentation from Ryanair.

Layout
The anna.aero website includes the following sections:
 Top Story: Analysis of recent news from the aviation industry.
 Route News: A weekly report of new airline routes that have been launched during the last week.
 Take-offs & Landings: A review and analysis of new airline route development. Also includes coverage of any high-profile route withdrawals.
 Airline Analysis: Analysis of airline's traffic developments and route networks.
 Airport Analysis: Analysis of airports, including recent developments of passenger traffic, variation in demand, key airlines, country markets and routes.
 Country feature: Analysis of airline routes, airport news, and national trends of a country or region.
 Farewatch: Analysis and commentary on the published airline fare data of a particular airline route.
 Market Trends: Looks at both airport and airline market trends, provides a regular update on airline industry trends across various national and international markets. On a monthly basis, the numbers of aircraft delivered by Airbus and Boeing to each airline customer are also presented and analysed.
 Route Analysis: In-depth report on a particular airline route.

anna.aero awards
 Weekly Awards: On a weekly basis, anna.aero awards "Route of the Week" to the new air service that best demonstrates the greatest tenacity and entrepreneurship as well as "Cake of the Week" to the best route welcoming cake.
 €URO ANNIES Awards: The €URO ANNIES Awards, on a regular basis awarded by anna.aero, are based on science, statistics, and evidence rather than the opinions of a panel of judges or votes.

References

External links
 

Aviation websites
2007 establishments in the United Kingdom